Petar Dobrović (14 January 1890 – 27 January 1942) was a Serbian painter and politician.

Biography 
Dobrović was born in Pécs, Kingdom of Hungary. A proponent of Serbian colorism, he was known for portraits and landscapes. He had earlier worked in impressionism and cubism.

He was briefly the President of a short-lived, small Serbian-Hungarian Baranya-Baja Republic in 1921, and later lived in Kingdom of Yugoslavia.

He died during the German occupation of Belgrade during the Second World War while in the elevator of the apartment building he lived in at 36 King Peter Street during a raid. He noticed the raid on the street and died while attempting to return to his flat. He is interred in the Belgrade New Cemetery.

Exhibitions 
Solo
 1912 Premises of the Women's Society, Pécs
 1919 Salon "Ulrich", Zagreb, City Hall, Novi Sad
 1920 Druga beogradska gimnazija, Belgrade
 1921 Stanković Hall, Belgrade
 1924 Salon Manes, Prague
 1925 Salon Galic, Split
 1927 Stock Exchange Building, Novi Sad
 1928 Great Hall of the County, Sombor, Society for the Advancement of Science and Art, Hall of the National Casino, Osijek, Art Pavilion, Zagreb
 1929 Art Salon Šira, Zagreb, Ceremonial Hall of the Novi Sad Music High School, Novi Sad
 1930 Art Pavilion, Belgrade
 1931 Pulhri Studio, Prague, Kunstring, Rotterdam, Kunstzalen A. Mak, Amsterdam
 1932 Denisuv Institut, Prague
 1933 French Club, Belgrade
 1934 Salon Ulrich, Zagreb. French Club, Belgrade
 1936 French Club, Belgrade
 1937 Matica Srpska Hall, Novi Sad
 1940 Art Pavilion, Belgrade

Posthumous
 1955 Art Pavilion "Cvijeta Zuzorić", Belgrade
 1974 Museum of Contemporary Art, retrospective, Belgrade, Gallery "Petar Dobrović", Belgrade, Modern Gallery, Ljubljana
 1981 Gallery of the Faculty of Fine Arts, Belgrade
 1983 Petar Dobrović Gallery, Belgrade
 1985 Gallery of Fine Arts, Belgrade
 1990 Museum space, retrospective, Zagreb, Matica Srpska Gallery, Novi Sad, National Museum, Belgrade, Museum Janus Panonius, Pécs
 1999 Petar Dobrović Gallery, Belgrade, Matica Srpska Gallery, Novi Sad
 2001 Petar Dobrović Gallery, Belgrade

Gallery

See also 
 List of Serbian painters

Notes

References

External links 
 Petar Dobrović
 Fine Arts in Hungary
 Webpage with Dobrović's works

1890 births
1942 deaths
People from Pécs
Serbs of Hungary
Austro-Hungarian Serbs
Heads of state of states with limited recognition
National presidents
Serbian politicians
20th-century Serbian painters
Austro-Hungarian emigrants to Yugoslavia
Serbian people of German descent
Burials at Belgrade New Cemetery
Serbian civilians killed in World War II
Deaths by airstrike during World War II
Serbian male painters
20th-century Serbian male artists